Yevgeni Vladimirovich Varlamov (born 25 July 1975) is a Russian football coach and a former player. He is an assistant coach with Kuban Krasnodar.

Honours
 Russian Premier League runner-up: 1998, 2002.
 Russian Premier League bronze: 1999.
 Russian Cup winner: 2002.
 Russian Cup runner-up: 2000.

International career
Varlamov played his first game for Russia on 27 May 1998 in a friendly against Poland. He played 10 games overall for Russia, scoring a goal in Euro 2000 qualifier against Ukraine.

External links 
  Profile
 

1975 births
Living people
Russian footballers
Russia under-21 international footballers
Russia international footballers
Russian expatriate footballers
Expatriate footballers in Ukraine
Russian expatriate sportspeople in Ukraine
FC KAMAZ Naberezhnye Chelny players
PFC CSKA Moscow players
FC Chernomorets Novorossiysk players
FC Kuban Krasnodar players
FC Metalist Kharkiv players
FC Akhmat Grozny players
Russian Premier League players
Ukrainian Premier League players
Footballers from Kazan
Association football defenders